WinDiff is a graphical file comparison program published by Microsoft (from 1992)., and is distributed with Microsoft Windows Support Tools, certain versions of Microsoft Visual Studio and as source-code with the Platform SDK code samples. WinDiff was included in the Windows SDK (previously known as the Platform SDK, previously known as the Resource Kit) until Microsoft Windows SDK for Windows 7 and .NET Framework 4 (a.k.a. Windows SDK 7.1). Because portions of the Windows SDK were shipped in Visual Studio, WinDiff was also included in Visual Studio until Visual Studio 2010. WinDiff was removed from the Windows 8 SDK and therefore is not included in Visual Studio 2012 or any later version. A number of unofficial standalone uploads do exist.

Versions

See also 
 Comparison of file comparison tools
 Windows Support Tools

References

External links 
  — Includes WinDiff (dead link)
 
 Unofficial upload at Grigsoft.com
 Unofficial upload at ComputerPerformance.co.uk

File comparison tools
Microsoft development tools
Microsoft Visual Studio